Carpenter is an unincorporated community in New Castle County, Delaware, United States. Carpenter is located where Delaware Route 92 crosses the former Baltimore & Ohio Railroad (now CSX Transportation's Philadelphia Subdivision), 6.5 miles northeast of Wilmington.

History
Carpenter's population was 18 in 1900, 52 in 1925, and 100 in 1960.

References

External links

Unincorporated communities in New Castle County, Delaware
Unincorporated communities in Delaware